Cedric Gagné-Marcoux (born September 27, 1982) is a former Canadian football guard. He was drafted by the Hamilton Tiger-Cats in the first round of the 2006 CFL Draft. He played college football at UCF.  He also played for the Toronto Argonauts.

External links
Just Sports Stats
CFL.ca bio
 

1982 births
Canadian football offensive linemen
Hamilton Tiger-Cats players
Living people
People from Baie-Comeau
Players of Canadian football from Quebec
Toronto Argonauts players
UCF Knights football players